"Unreal" is a song by American metal band Ill Niño. The song was released as the band's third and final single from their debut album Revolution Revolución.

Music video
The song's official music video shows the band performing the song live.

Track listing

Chart positions

Personnel
 Christian Machado – vocals
 Jardel Martins Paisante – guitar
 Marc Rizzo – guitar
 Lazaro Pina – bass
 Dave Chavarri – drums
 Roger Vasquez – percussion

References

2001 songs
2002 singles
Ill Niño songs
Roadrunner Records singles
Songs written by Cristian Machado